Ficus palmata, the Punjab fig, or "Bedu" is a plant in the family Moraceae.

Description
The flowers are greenish white.

Subspecies 
 Ficus palmata subsp. palmata
 Ficus palmata subsp. virgata (Roxb.) Browicz
 = Ficus virgata Roxb.
 = Ficus caricoides Roxb.
 = Ficus pseudocarica Miq.
 = Ficus urticifolia Roxb.

Distribution and habitat
Ficus palmata is native to Northeastern Africa: from Egypt south to Somalia, and to the Arabian Peninsula and Syria (the typical subspecies) and to Asia: from the Arabian Peninsula and Iran east to India and the Himalayas (subspecies virgata). In the Himalayan region, its fruit is widely sold and consumed.

References

palmata
Flora of Egypt
Flora of Northeast Tropical Africa
Flora of the Arabian Peninsula
Flora of Western Asia
Flora of the Indian subcontinent
Plants described in 1775